Emanuele Terranova (born 14 April 1987) is an Italian footballer who plays as a defender for  club Reggina.

Career
Terranova started his career playing with a number of local amateur teams, including Eccellenza side Campobello, then joining the Palermo youth system in 2005 and playing with the Primavera under-20 squad with the rosanero.

He successively spent the entire 2007–08 season on loan to Vicenza of Serie B, being also often featured as a regular. He played the 2008–09 season again out on loan, this time to Livorno, being part of the Tuscans' successful campaign that led them back to Serie A after only one season. Livorno decided not to make an offer for a permanent deal, so Terranova returned to Palermo, and joined Walter Zenga's first team squad.

On 19 August 2009, Terranova was loaned out to Serie B outfit Lecce, with an option for the giallorossi from Apulia to buy half of the player's transfer rights at the end of the season, which the club did not use. In July 2010, Terranova went out on loan again, this time to Frosinone.

On 1 July 2011, Serie B club Sassuolo announced that they had completed the permanent signing of Terranova from Palermo.

On 17 August 2018, Terranova signed with Cremonese. On 30 August 2021, he was loaned to Bari, with an obligation to buy in case of Bari's promotion to Serie B.

On 31 January 2023, Terranova moved to Reggina on a year-and-a-half-long contract.

Career statistics

Honours 
Lecce
 Serie B: 2009–10

Sassuolo
 Serie B: 2012–13 

Bari
 Serie C: 2021–22 (Group C)

References

External links
 Gazzetta dello Sport profile
 AIC.Football.it profile

1987 births
Living people
People from Mazara del Vallo
Sportspeople from the Province of Trapani
Footballers from Sicily
Italian footballers
Association football defenders
Serie A players
Serie B players
Serie C players
Palermo F.C. players
L.R. Vicenza players
U.S. Livorno 1915 players
U.S. Lecce players
Frosinone Calcio players
U.S. Sassuolo Calcio players
U.S. Cremonese players
S.S.C. Bari players
Reggina 1914 players